was a Japanese sprinter. He was selected for the 1932 Los Angeles Olympics but had to drop out because of an injury. He competed in the men's 100 metres at the 1936 Summer Olympics. He later worked at the Japanese Ministry of Education and was the starter for the 100 meter finals at the 1964 Tokyo Olympics.

References

1912 births
1983 deaths
Place of birth missing
Japanese male sprinters
Olympic male sprinters
Olympic athletes of Japan
Athletes (track and field) at the 1936 Summer Olympics
Japan Championships in Athletics winners
20th-century Japanese people